The Guardian First Book Award was a literary award presented by The Guardian newspaper. It annually recognised one book by a new writer. It was established in 1999, replacing the Guardian Fiction Award or Guardian Fiction Prize that the newspaper had sponsored from 1965. The Guardian First Book Award was discontinued in 2016, with the 2015 awards being the last.

History
The newspaper determined to change its book award after 1998, and during that year also hired Claire Armitstead as literary editor. At the inaugural First Book Award ceremony in 1999, she said that she was informed of the change, details to be arranged, by the head of the marketing department during her second week on the job. "By the time we left the room we had decided on two key things. We would make it a first book award, and we would involve reading groups in the judging process. This was going to be the people's prize." About the opening of the prize to nonfiction she had said in August, "readers do not segregate their reading into fiction or non-fiction, so neither should we." There was no restriction on genre; for example, both poetry and travel would be included in principle, and so would self-published autobiographies.

For the first rendition, 140 books were submitted, including a lot of nonfiction strongest "by far" in "a hybrid of travel-writing and reportage"; weak in science and biography. Experts led by Armitstead selected a longlist of 11 and Borders book stores in Glasgow, London, Brighton and Leeds hosted reading groups that considered one book a week, September to November, and selected a shortlist of six. A panel of eight judges including two Guardian editors chose the winner. The newspaper called it "the first time the ordinary reading public have been involved in the selection of a major literary prize." In the event, the 1999 reading groups selected a shortlist including six novels, and all four groups favoured the novel Ghostwritten by David Mitchell. Their second favourite was one of the travelogue and reporting hybrids, by Philip Gourevitch of The New Yorker. The judges chose the latter, We Wish To Inform You That Tomorrow We Will Be Killed With Our Families —"a horrifying but humane account of the Rwandan genocide, its causes and consequences", the newspaper called it in August.

The prize was worth £10,000 to the winner. Eligible titles were published in English, and in the UK within the calendar year.

Winners and finalists

See also

 Guardian Children's Fiction Prize
 Orange Award for New Writers
 The Whitfield Prize
 Guardian Fiction Prize
 Vanguard Personality of the Year Awards

References

Annual home pages for the First Book Award, 1999 to present

  Guardian First Book Award 1999
 Guardian First Book Award 2000
 Guardian First Book Award 2001
 Guardian First Book Award 2002
 Guardian First Book award 2003
 Guardian First Book Award 2004
 Guardian First Book Award 2005
 Guardian First Book Award 2006
 Guardian First Book Award 2007
 Guardian First Book award 2008
 Guardian First Book award 2009
 Guardian First Book award 2010
 Guardian First Book award 2011
 Guardian First Book award 2012
 Guardian First Book award 2013
 Guardian First Book award 2014
 Guardian First Book award 2015

External links
 Books at The Guardian

British literary awards
First Book Award
Literary awards by magazines and newspapers
First book awards
Awards established in 1999
1999 establishments in the United Kingdom
Awards disestablished in 2015
2015 disestablishments in the United Kingdom